Philip Derek Christophers (born on 16 June 1980 in Heidelberg) is a former rugby union footballer, who played on the wing for Castres and, briefly, England.

Christophers was born and raised in Germany with an English father and a German mother. At 16 he moved to England to attend the sixth form at Lancaster Royal Grammar School, where he represented England at under-16 and under-18 level. He studied Geography at Loughborough University, for whom he played in a BUSA final. In 2000, he took a year out of his studies playing for Brive and represented England under-21s. On graduation, in 2001, he signed full-time with Bristol Shoguns.

During the 2002/03, season Christophers was a regular for Bristol Shoguns and a bit-part player for England. However, when Bristol Shoguns were relegated at end of that season, he signed for Leeds Tykes.

Christophers scored a try on his England debut against Argentina. In his third and final appearance for England, he came on as a replacement in the 2003 Six Nations Championship match against Wales. However just after coming on he was sin-binned. England went on to win the Grand Slam.

During the 2003/04 season at Leeds, he was named both the Players Player of the Year and Supporters Player of the Year. He toured New Zealand and Australia with England, but did not play.

At the end of the 2004-05 season, Leeds won the Powergen Cup where he was a starter.

At the end of the 2004/05 season, he decided to join Castres Olympiques in the Top 14 in France.  He played for Castres from 2005-10. Without a club from July 2010 until the end of June 2011, he played two years for Aix en Provence in the Pro D2 before ending his professional career in the summer of 2013.

Honours
Runner-up versus Gloucester in the 2002 Premiership Final
Six Nations Grand Slam 2003
Powergen Cup/Anglo-Welsh Cup titles: 1
2005

References

External links 
 England profile
 rugby-heroes.net profile

England international rugby union players
English rugby union players
Rugby union wings
Bristol Bears players
Leeds Tykes players
1980 births
Living people
Alumni of Loughborough University
People educated at Lancaster Royal Grammar School
Loughborough Students RUFC players
Sportspeople from Heidelberg